Beauty and the Bestie is a 2015 Filipino action comedy film directed by Wenn V. Deramas, starring Vice Ganda and Coco Martin, alongside James Reid, and Nadine Lustre in their also stars. It is an official entry to the 2015 Metro Manila Film Festival.

It was produced by ABS-CBN Film Productions and VIVA Films and was released nationwide under the banner of Star Cinema. It was also released overseas in cities that have a significant Filipino population. It is the third highest-grossing Filipino film of all time next to The Super Parental Guardians. This is Wenn V. Deramas' last film before his death on February 29, 2016, and last film as a co-production between Star Cinema and Viva Films in preparation for the co-production between TV5 and Viva in 2016 until it was revoked before the launch of Finally Found Someone. The film's title is a play on the 1740 French novel by Gabrielle-Suzanne Barbot de Villeneuve.

Plot

Erika (Vice Ganda) isn't making nearly enough money running a photography studio to support her family. The problem is exacerbated when their young nephew is diagnosed with a rare condition that may lead to blindness. That's when their former best friend Emman (Coco Martin) suddenly shows up. Emman works for the Elite Super Secret Task Force, a spy agency tasked with the security of an upcoming beauty pageant. Erika happens to look exactly like Ms. Uzeklovakia, who was abducted by terrorists led by a Japanese Yakuza named Daemon Yu (Jacky Woo) and their Korean right-hand man, Jin Jhong (Ryan Bang).

Emman asks Erika to pretend to be Ms. Uzeklovakia while the agency searches for the real deal. Erika is still nursing some hurt from the way she and Emman ended things, and ended up taking on the task in exchange for help in caring for her family. Aside from all this, Erika's younger sister Abi (Nadine Lustre) and Emman's half-brother Tristan (James Reid) meet and end up falling in love. Erika must deal with their feelings for their former best friend while fending off terrorists and dealing with their worry for Abi's budding romance.

Before the Q/A portion of the coronation night, Erika encounters the real Ms. Uzeklovakia after she manages to escape from her kidnappers which she was disgusted from their scent until she was intercepted by Emman and their friends in order to secure her from the terrorists. With that Erika continues to pose as Ms. Uzeklovakia until she wins the pageant. It was soon interrupted by the terrorists who are attempting to kill the fake which is Erika and Daemon manage to kidnap them thinking they were Ms. Uzeklovakia. Emman eventually intercepts the helicopter. As Erika and Daemon fight, Emman manages to finally kill Daemon in time as Erika falls onto the ledge of the helicopter. Erika takes Emman's hand and finally reconciles their friendship until he drops Erika's hand and falls into the ocean which Emman follows them.

When Emman attempts to make CPR towards Erika after falling each other into the ocean, they were still alive and soon reunites with her family.
After the incident, the father of Ms. Uzeklovakia, the Uzeklovakian prime minister was happy that his daughter won the contest thanks to Erika's efforts in pretending as herself after she returns to their home country and reuniting with her father and he congratulates both Emman and Erika for rescuing her as both of them make their thankful speech.

The movie ends where both Emman and Erika are eating fishballs from a fishball bystander and both senses the shades was a detonator and it explodes knowing that another terrorist abducts another person from another country which results in them being summoned to their new mission.

Cast

Main cast

 Vice Ganda as Eric "Erika" Villavicencio / Natalia Thalia Nutreila
 Coco Martin as Emman Castillo

Supporting cast
 James Reid as Tristan Adams
 Nadine Lustre as Abi Villavicencio
 Marco Masa as Jimbo Villavicencio
 Alonzo Muhlach as Jumbo Villavicencio
 Karla Estrada as Barbara "Ms. Barney" Clooney 
 Lassy Marquez as Jude
 MC Calaquian as Stef
 Badjie Mortiz as George
 Jacky Woo as Daemon Yu
 Ryan Bang as Jin Jhong
 Tetchie Agbayani as Coney
 Boom Labrusca as Joseph
 Ron Morales as Rob
 Tess Antonio as Riff
 Menggie Cobarrubias as Eddie
 Chrome Cosio as Jake
 Jelson Bay as Chief Ben
 Valerie Concepcion as Editha "Edith" Villavicencio

Additional cast
 Jay-R as himself
 Karen Reyes as Nurse
 Raikko Mateo as Angelo
 Phoemela Baranda as herself
 Wendell Ramos as Jojo
 Miguel Faustmann as PM Thor
 Wilma Doesn't as Ms. Upanghet
 Bea Santiago as Ms. Philippines
 Randy See as Dr. Kenneth Sy
 Ahron Villena as the Fishball Vendor

Release
The film was released nationwide on December 25, 2015, as an official entry to the 41st Metro Manila Film Festival. It was also released around the world on cities that have significant Filipino population except in the Middle East where the film was censored due to the region's predominantly Islamic religion.

Marketing
The teaser trailer of the film was released on YouTube on November 28, 2015, followed by its official trailer on December 4, 2015. This was followed by extensive TV spots on ABS-CBN network and its sister cable channels. It was also heavily promoted on the social media accounts of Star Cinema, VIVA, ABS-CBN and its subsidiaries including Vice Ganda's official Facebook account where he has over 12 million likes. A special dedicated page was also created by Star Cinema on its official website.

Music
The official theme song of the film is a cover of Jolina Magdangal's 90's hit "Chuva Choo Choo" which was relyricized and sung by Vice Ganda.

Reception

Box office
The Metro Manila Film Festival committee did not disclose the official breakdown of the box office gross for each film, instead, they released the total box office gross of all the films in the festival and listed the top four films in no particular order. From the beginning to the end of the festival, Beauty and the Bestie was consistently included on the list of the top 4 grossing films, the other being My Bebe Love: #KiligPaMore, Haunted Mansion, and #WalangForever. GMA Films on the other hand reported that their film My Bebe Love was the highest-grossing film during the opening day with an earning of 60.4 million pesos. All other studios and distributors did not disclose their respective opening day gross. The Metro Manila Film Festival committee's reason for not disclosing the gross box office breakdown for each film was "to protect the other four film entries that did not make it on the top four." By January 7, 2016, the official closing of the festival, the film has grossed 428 million pesos making it the highest-grossing film in the 41st Metro Manila Film Festival. On January 25, 2016, the film has grossed 526 million pesos domestically, making it, at the time, the highest grossing Filipino film in domestic box office and the second highest grossing Filipino film of all time behind only A Second Chance.

Critical response
Beauty and the Bestie received mixed reviews from critics with many praising the humor, stunts, and other action sequences while criticizing the story and the acting.

Movies In the Philippines in a review have given the film a rating of 2.5 out of 5 stars stating, "The film's comedy works the same but thankfully, adding Coco Martin to its story makes it watchable as he's character drives the narrative in a convincing way." the critic added "The good thing about Beauty and the Bestie is that it doesn’t rely much on satirical comedy or other out-of-nowhere input to the story just to make things fun or make fun of things." Oggs Cruz of Rappler.com commented that, "Beauty and the Bestie is a whole lot of everything resulting to nothing", but he also added, "However, when the film becomes true to the fact that it is just a medley of punchlines, it sort of works. There are lengthy bits in the film that are truly funny. It surely helps that Vice Ganda is a very capable comedian who can use both his wit and his awkwardly masculine frame to deliver jokes that render parts of the film worthwhile." Philberty Dy of ClickTheCity rated the film 3.5 out of 5 stating, "It just gets sillier and sillier, and that's a good way to go." and "Beauty and the Bestie thrives on Absurdity"

Controversies

Ticket swapping incident
On the opening day of the 2015 Metro Manila Film Festival, several moviegoers raised concerns on social media that the tickets they bought for another MMFF movie, My Bebe Love:#KiligPaMore were misprinted. Instead, their tickets had the title of Beauty and the Bestie. This was confirmed by Jose Javier Reyes on Twitter. In the official Twitter account of SM Cinema, it tweeted that there was indeed a mistake in the tickets but the tweets were removed. However, on December 26, 2015, Metro Manila Development Authority, organizer of the festival, denied the accusations involving this incident. They added that the accusations were baseless and stated that fans should "be responsible in expressing their sentiments especially on social media."  Wenn Deramas, director of Beauty and the Bestie, was skeptical about the ticket swapping incident and countered the claims of those moviegoers.

Accolades

References

External links
 Beauty and the Bestie at Star Cinema's Information
 

2015 films
2015 action comedy films
2015 LGBT-related films
2010s buddy comedy films
2010s teen comedy films
Filipino-language films
Films directed by Wenn V. Deramas
LGBT-related buddy comedy films
Philippine action comedy films
Philippine teen films
Star Cinema films
2010s Tagalog-language films
Teen LGBT-related films
Viva Films films
Philippine LGBT-related films